The Sun Wheel is a giant Ferris wheel located in the Asia Park theme park in the city of Da Nang in central Vietnam. It takes 15 minutes to revolve, and has a capacity of 384 people. Asia Park was designed by the studio of architect Bill Bensley.

History
It was the tallest Ferris Wheel in the world from 1992 to 1997. It was closed in 2001. It was dismantled, relocated from Japan to Vietnam, and rebuilt on a taller base.

References

Ferris wheels in Vietnam